Sitapur Lok Sabha constituency is one of the 80 Lok Sabha (parliamentary) constituencies in Uttar Pradesh state in northern India.

Assembly segments
Presently, Sitapur Lok Sabha constituency comprises five Vidhan Sabha (legislative assembly) segments. These are:

Members of Parliament

Election Results

See also
 Sitapur district
 List of Constituencies of the Lok Sabha

References

External links
Sitapur lok sabha  constituency election 2019 result

Lok Sabha constituencies in Uttar Pradesh
Politics of Sitapur district